Yinghai Area, or Yinghai Town, is an area and a town of Daxing District, Beijing, located between the 5th and 6th Ring Roads. As of 2020, it has 102,463 inhabitants under its administration.

In 1902, Qing government established wasteland cultivation program within the region. The settlement here was named Yinghaizhuang, and it was taken from a combination of Yingzhou, the place where settlers came from; and Haizili, the name of this region at the time. Later it was shorten to Yinghai.

History

Administrative divisions 
At the end of 2021, Yinghai Area consisted of 20 subdivisions, in which 19 were residential communities, and 1 was an industrial area:

See also 
List of township-level divisions of Beijing

References

Daxing District

Towns in Beijing
Areas of Beijing